The defensive attribution hypothesis (or bias, theory, or simply defensive attribution) is a social psychological term where an observer attributes the causes for a mishap to minimize their fear of being a victim or a cause in a similar situation. The attributions of blame are negatively correlated to similarities between the observer and the people involved in the mishap, i.e. more responsibility is attributed to the people involved who are dissimilar to the observer. Assigning responsibility allows the observer to believe that the mishap was controllable and thus preventable.

A defensive attribution may also be used to protect the person's self-esteem if, despite everything, the mishap does occur, because blame can be assigned to the "other" (person or situation). The use of defensive attributions is considered a cognitive bias because an individual will change their beliefs about a situation based upon their motivations or desires rather than the factual characteristics of the situation.

Research
Walster (1966) hypothesized that it can be frightening to believe that a misfortune could happen to anyone at random, and attributing responsibility to the person(s) involved helps to manage this emotional reaction.

Shaver (1970) recognized that the similarity of the witness to the person(s) involved in the misfortune – in terms of situation, age, gender, personality, etc. – changes the amount of responsibility one is ready to ascribe. Where Walster's work suggested increases in attributed responsibility, Shaver's concept of "defensive attribution" argued for minimization of assigned responsibility based on perceived similarities between the attributor and the person(s) involved. Shaver was able to demonstrate this response by describing events to test subjects; varying the situations and people described to either match or be significantly different from the subjects: as similarity with witnesses increased, attributions of responsibility decreased.

In 1981 Jerry Burger published a meta-analysis of 22 peer-reviewed studies on the defensive attribution hypothesis, in which he found strong evidence to support Shaver's hypothesized negative relationship between similarity and responsibility.

Sexual assault
Researchers examining sexual assault have consistently found that male participants blamed rapists less than female participants did, and that male participants blamed the rape victims more than female participants did. These findings support Shaver's similarity-responsibility hypothesis: male participants, who are personally similar to (male) rapists, blame rapists less than female participants who are dissimilar to rapists. On the other hand, female participants, who are personally similar to (female) rape victims, blame the victims less than male participants.

See also
 Attribution bias
 Just-world hypothesis
 Omission bias
 Self-serving bias
 Victim blaming

References

Bibliography
 
 
 

Cognitive biases